In statistics, the generalized Dirichlet distribution (GD) is a generalization of the Dirichlet distribution with a more general covariance structure and almost twice the number of parameters.   Random vectors with a GD distribution are completely  neutral .

where we define . Here  denotes the Beta function.

Connor and Mosimann define the PDF as they did for the following reason.

Alternative form given by Wong  

Wong  gives the slightly more concise form for 

General moment function

If , then

Thus

Reduction to standard Dirichlet distribution

As stated above, if  for  then the distribution reduces to a standard Dirichlet. This condition is different from the usual case, in which setting the additional parameters of the generalized distribution to zero results in the original distribution. However, in the case of the GDD, this results in a very complicated density function.

Bayesian analysis

Suppose  is generalized Dirichlet, and that  is multinomial with  trials (here ).

Sampling experiment

Wong gives the following system as an example of how the Dirichlet and generalized Dirichlet distributions differ.  He posits that a large urn contains  balls of  different colours.  The proportion of each colour is unknown.  Write  for the proportion of the balls with colour  in the urn.

Experiment 1. Analyst 1 believes that  (ie,  is Dirichlet with parameters ). Then analyst 1 draws a ball from the urn, observes its colour (say colour ) and puts it in box . He can identify the correct box because they are transparent and the colours of the marbles within are visible. The  process continues until  balls have been drawn. The posterior distribution is then Dirichlet with parameters being the number of marbles in each box.

Experiment 2. Analyst 2 believes that  follows a generalized Dirichlet distribution: . All parameters are again assumed to be positive integers. The analyst makes  wooden boxes. The boxes have two areas: one for balls and one for marbles. The balls are coloured but the marbles are not coloured. He then puts a ball of colour  in box . The analyst then draws a ball from the urn. Because the boxes are wood, the analyst cannot tell which box to put the ball in (as he could in experiment 1 above); he also has a poor memory and cannot remember which box contains which colour balls. He has to discover which box is the correct one to put the ball in. He does this by opening box 1 and comparing the balls in it to the drawn ball. If the colours differ, the box is the wrong one. The analyst puts a marble (sic) in box 1 and proceeds to box 2. He repeats the process until the balls in the box match the drawn ball, at which point he puts the ball (sic) in the box with the other balls of matching colour. The analyst then draws another ball from the urn and repeats until  balls are drawn. The posterior is then generalized Dirichlet with parameters  being the number of balls, and  the number of marbles, in each box. 

Note that in experiment 2, changing the order of the boxes has a non-trivial effect, unlike experiment 1.

See also

 Dirichlet-multinomial distribution
 Lukacs's proportion-sum independence theorem

References

Continuous distributions
Multivariate continuous distributions
Conjugate prior distributions
Exponential family distributions